Euphorbia is a highly diverse plant genus, comprising some 5,000 currently accepted taxa.

This is an alphabetical list of the Euphorbia species and notable infraspecific taxa.

The list includes the former (and never generally accepted) genus Chamaesyce, as well as the related genera Elaeophorbia, Endadenium, Monadenium, Synadenium and Pedilanthus which according to recent DNA sequence-based phylogenetic studies are all nested within Euphorbia

Noticeably succulent plants are marked by (s).

A–F

G–O

P–Z

Notes

References 
  (2006): A new subgeneric classification for Euphorbia (Euphorbiaceae) in southern Africa based on ITS and psbA-trnH sequence data. Taxon 55(2): 397–420. HTML abstract
 & al. (2010). World Checklist of Malpighiales. The Board of Trustees of the Royal Botanic Gardens.Euphorbia L., Sp. Pl.: 450 (1753)
  (2003): The submersion of Pedilanthus into Euphorbia (Euphorbiaceae). Acta Botanica Mexicana 65: 45-50. PDF fulltext [English with Spanish abstract]
  (2002): Phylogenetic relationships in Euphorbieae (Euphorbiaceae) based on ITS and ndhF sequence data. Annals of the Missouri Botanical Garden 89(4): 453–490.  (HTML abstract, first page image)

External links

Euphorb